Cadra acuta is a species of snout moth in the genus Cadra. It was described by Marianne Horak in 1994. It is found in the Northern Territory as well as on the Cape York Peninsula in Australia.

The wingspan is about 13 mm for males and 13–14 mm for females.

References

Phycitini
Moths described in 1994
Taxa named by Marianne Horak
Moths of Australia